Poręby Stare  is a village in the administrative district of Gmina Dobre, within Mińsk County, Masovian Voivodeship, in east-central Poland.

References

Villages in Mińsk County